Ilpenstein Castle (dutch: Ilpenstein, Huis te Ilpendam, Hof te Ilpendam) was a castle of the Free and high Lordship of Purmerend, Purmerland and Ilpendam, located in Ilpendam (Waterland) in the north of the city of Amsterdam.

History
In the year 1618 Volkert Overlander - knight, mayor and advisor of the city of Amsterdam - bought the Lordship from the Count of Egmond. In 1622 Overlander built the castle of Ilpenstein.

After Overlanders death Frans Banning Cocq, who had married his daughter Maria, inherited his influence and properties in the north of Amsterdam as well as the title Lord of Purmerland and Ilpendam. After Banning Cocqs death in 1655 the castle belonged to the Amsterdam regent family De Graeff.

Joost van den Vondel wrote poems about Pieter de Graeffs and Jacoba Bickers wedding in 1662 at castle Ilpenstein. Their cousin and brother-in-law Johan de Witt was also at the wedding.

The last residents of the castle were Christina Elisabeth de Graeff and her husband Jacob Gerrit van Garderen. In 1872, the castle was sold and  demolished and a new building was constructed at the site.

See also
List of castles in the Netherlands

External links
 
 De Bruijn, J.H. De bewoners van het Kasteel Ilpenstein en hun nakomelingen, 1827 - 1957. Ilpendam 1958
 Moelker, H.P. De heerlijkheid Purmerland en Ilpendam (1978 Purmerend)
 Het Huis te Ilpendam en deszelfs voornaamste Bezitters (nl)
 Ilpensteinstraat at Nijmegen (nl)

References 

House De Graeff
Lords of Purmerland and Ilpendam
Buildings and structures completed in 1622
Buildings and structures demolished in 1872
Palaces in the Netherlands
Ruined castles in the Netherlands
Castles in North Holland
Waterland
1622 establishments in the Dutch Republic